The Epsom Salts Monorail or Magnesium Monorail was a short-lived Lartigue Monorail in San Bernardino County, California, in the United States. It was built to carry epsomite from a deposit in the Owlshead Mountains to a siding of the Trona Railway. The monorail was opened in 1924 and closed in June 1926.

History 

Thomas Wright, a florist from Los Angeles, set up a camp in Crystal Hills Wash in 1918 and prepared an area for salt mining, where he had previously found some minerals. Building a narrow-gauge railway line was considered to be too expensive, so that they decided to build a monorail on wooden trestles. They founded the American Magnesium Company to construct the monorail track from freshly logged Douglas firs, which were shipped to San Pedro and then transported by the Trona Railway to the sidings at Magnesia near Searles. Construction began in 1922 and by September they had passed the half-way point with 15 of 28 miles (25 of 45 km).

The monorail was completed and inaugurated in 1924. However, it transported less salt than originally estimated within the first two years of its use.

The mine employed 12–15 workers in 1924/25. The epsomite could initially be scraped from the surface using gardener's tools, but the high-quality minerals were quickly depleted, and the remainder was mixed with 50% contaminants of sand, debris and other salts. The return on investment was hampered by the high transportation cost to the factory of the American Magnesium Company in Wilmington, especially caused by the high maintenance cost for the wooden track, which distorted when the beams dried, by initially inappropriate locomotives and by landslides which damaged the track. The mine was closed in 1926. As no buyers could be found for the complete installation, only a small percentage of the initial investments could be rescued during the liquidation of the company.

Route 

At the other side of the valley it climbed with a gradient of 10–12% to the Wingate Pass, followed then the Wingate Wash and the Crystal Hills Wash and turned finally eastwards to the camp and mine.

Track 
Before construction began, a prototype was built and a patent was taken out on June 23, 1923.

A conventional steel rail with 50 to 80 lb/yd (25–40 kg/m) was installed on a central  wooden beam.

Rolling stock 

The locomotives and carriages had rectangular steel frames, in which a double-flanged steel wheel ran at either end. To balance the vehicle, it had spring-suspended steel rollers with  height and  diameter. The couplings between the carriages were reused from scrapped Los Angeles trams.

The load was stored in two containers on either side of the vehicles, to keep the center of gravity as low as possible, similar to loading the saddle bags of a mule. The locomotives had a design similar to the carriages. The first locomotive was battery-operated, but it was not powerful enough to tow loaded trains. Therefore, seven conventional Fordson tractors and one Buda tractor were modified to build articulated monorail locomotives.

Brakes were only installed on the locomotives, which caused recurring problems. Each locomotive could carry a maximum of 3,400 pounds (1.5t)  while the carriages could carry 8,500 pounds (3.9t) each.

Remains 

The monorail was disassembled for scrap in the late 1930s. Only some A frames remained. The largest part of the monorail is now in a restricted area of the China Lake Naval Weapons Center "B" Range. The mine, however, is inside the Death Valley National Park and accessible via the Fort Irwin Army Base near Tecopa.
The sidings of the Trona Railway can be reached by an unsurfaced track from California Highway 178. If carriages are parked on the sidings, these are easy to spot. There are some concrete foundations and ruins of houses in the area.

See also
Potash wars (California)

References

Further reading 

 
  (Republished in Trains and Travel, October 1951)

Monorails in the United States
Death Valley
Death Valley National Park
1924 establishments in California
1926 disestablishments in California